Ekaterina Kondaurova (born 20 August 1982) is a Russian ballet dancer, currently one of the stars of the Mariinsky Ballet from Saint Petersburg.

Early life
Born in Moscow, Kondaurova is the daughter of an optician. She showed an early interest in gymnastics, piano and dance. After she failed to gain admission to the Bolshoi Ballet School, her mother was successful in having her accepted by the Vaganova Academy of Russian Ballet in Saint Petersburg. After graduating in 2001, she immediately joined the Mariinsky.

Career
While on tour to Frankfurt in 2003, Kondaurova was noticed by the choreographer William Forsythe who the following year invited her to dance in the Mariinsky premiere of his In the Middle, Somewhat Elevated. As a result of the excellent reviews she received, she soon starred in other contemporary works by Forsythe, Alexei Ratmansky and Kirill Simonov. Olga Chenchikova, her coach until 2007, ensured her success in classical ballet roles, for example with her personalized interpretation of Nikiya in La Bayadère. Since 2007, her coach has been Elvira Tarasova. Kondaurova has also danced in several of George Balanchine's ballets including Symphony in C and Jewels (ballet).

In 2008, Kondaurova married Islom Baimuradov, her frequent Mariinsky dancing partner. She shares his interests in walking, gastronomy and interior decoration. She became a principal dancer at the Mariinsky Ballet in 2012.

Repertoire

Giselle (Myrtha, Zulma); choreography by Jean Coralli, Jules Perrot, and Marius Petipa
Le Corsaire (Medora); choreography by Marius Petipa
La Bayadère (Nikiya, Gamzatti); choreography by Marius Petipa, revised version by Vladimir Ponomarev and Vakhtang Chabukiani
The Sleeping Beauty (Lilac Fairy); choreography by Marius Petipa, revised version by Konstantin Sergeyev
The Sleeping Beauty (Lilac Fairy); choreography by Marius Petipa, revised version by Sergei Vikharev
Swan Lake (Odette-Odile); choreography by Marius Petipa and Lev Ivanov, revised version by Konstantin Sergeyev
Raymonda (Raymonda, Henrietta, Grand pas); choreography by Marius Petipa, revised version by Konstantin Sergeyev
Paquita Grand Pas (variation); choreography by Marius Petipa, revised version by Konstantin Sergeyev
Paquita (Paquita); choreography by Yuri Smekalov
Don Quixote (Queen of the Dryads, Street Dancer); choreography by Alexander Gorsky
The Firebird (Firebird); choreography by Michel Fokine
Scheherazade (Zobeide); choreography by Michel Fokine
DyinThe Swan; choreography by Michel Fokine
Prodigal Son (the Siren); choreography by George Balanchine
Serenade; choreography by George Balanchine
Symphony in C (Second Movement); choreography by George Balanchine
The Four Temperaments (Choleric); choreography by George Balanchine
Jewels (Emeralds, Rubies, Diamonds); choreography by George Balanchine
La valse; choreography by George Balanchine
A Midsummer Night's Dream (Titania, Hippolyta); choreography by George Balanchine
Marguerite and Armand (Marguerite); choreography by Frederick Ashton
Le jeune homme et la mort (the Girl); choreography by Roland Petit
The Fountain of Bakhchisarai (Zarema, Maria); choreography by Rostislav Zakharov
Spartacus (Phrygia, Aegina); choreography by Leonid Yakobson
Pas de quatre (Marie Taglioni); choreography by Anton Dolin
The Legend of Love (Mekhemene Banu); choreography by Yuri Grigorovich
Leningrad Symphony (the Girl); choreography by Igor Belsky
Romeo and Juliet (Juliet); choreography by Leonid Lavrovsky
""Walpurgisnacht" (Nymphs); choreography by Leonid Lavrovsky
Carmen Suite (Carmen); choreography by Alberto Alonso
In the Night; choreography by Jerome Robbins
5 Tangos; choreography by Hans van Manen
Simple Things (soloist); choreography by Emil Faski
Without; choreography by Benjamin Millepied
La Nuit S'acheve; choreography by Benjamin Millepied
Steptext; choreography by William Forsythe
In the Middle, Somewhat Elevated; choreography by William Forsythe
Approximate Sonata; choreography by William Forsythe
The Magic Nut (Temptress); choreography by Donvena Pandoursky and Mihail Chemiakin
The Nutcracker (Queen of the Snowflakes, Oriental Dance); choreography by Mihail Chemiakin and Kirill Simonov
Cinderella (Stepmother); choreography by Alexei Ratmansky
The Little Humpbacked Horse (Mare, Sea Princess); choreography by Alexei Ratmansky
Anna Karenina (Anna); choreography by Alexei Ratmansky
Concerto DSCH; choreography by Alexei Ratmansky
Ondine (Queen of the Sea); choreography by Pierre Lacotte
Le Parc (Soloist); choreography by Angelin Preljocaj
Gentle Memories; choreography by Jiri Bubenicek
Sacre; choreography by Sasha Waltz
Infra; choreography by Wayne McGregor
The Bronze Horseman (Queen of the Ball); choreography by Yuri Smekalov
Choreographic Game 3x3; choreography by Anton Pimonov
Inside the Lines; choreography by Anton Pimonov
The Cat on the Tree; choreography by Anton Pimonov
The Four Seasons; choreography by Ilya Zhivoi
Reverence; choreography by David Dawson
Le Bourgeois gentilhomme (Marchioness Dorimene); choreography by Nikita Dmitrievsky
Glass Heart (Alma); choreography by Noah D. Gelber
SeasonS; choreography by Ilya Zhivoi
The Dreamers: Within; choreography by Vladimir Varnava
Motherboard; choreography by Ilya Zhivoi
Lose Yourself to Dance; choreography by Maxim Petrov and Ilya Zhivoi

Awards
Ekaterina Kondaurova has received the following awards:
2006: Prix Benois de la Danse
2008: St. Petersburg's Golden Sofit award (Alma, Glass Heart)
2010: St Petersburg's Golden Sofit award (Anna Karenina)
2011: Golden Mask for her title role in Anna Karenina
2011: Recipient of Ballet magazine's Spirit of Dance award in the category “Star”

References

1982 births
Living people
Prima ballerinas
Russian ballerinas
Mariinsky Ballet principal dancers
Dancers from Moscow
Prix Benois de la Danse winners
Recipients of the Golden Mask
21st-century Russian ballet dancers